The orange-bellied antwren (Terenura sicki) is a species of bird in the family Thamnophilidae. It is endemic to Brazil.

Its natural habitat is subtropical or tropical moist lowland forests. It is threatened by habitat loss.

References

External links
BirdLife Species Factsheet.

orange-bellied antwren
Endemic birds of Brazil
orange-bellied antwren
Taxonomy articles created by Polbot